Excuse Me is the debut studio album by Portuguese singer Salvador Sobral. It was released in Portugal on 2 August 2016, peaking at number 1 on the Portuguese Albums Chart in May 2017, following Sobral's victory at the Eurovision Song Contest 2017. The album includes the singles "Excuse Me" and "Nem Eu", the latter being a cover of a 1952 song of the same name by Brazilian samba singer-songwriter Dorival Caymmi.

Singles
"Excuse Me" was released as the lead single from the album on 2 August 2016. The song peaked at number 22 on the Portuguese Singles Chart. "Nem Eu" was released as the second single from the album on 27 October 2016. The song peaked at number 25 on the Portuguese Singles Chart.

Track listing

Charts

Release history

References

2016 debut albums
Salvador Sobral albums